Nathaniel Eric Richert is an American actor, musician and songwriter, best known as Harvey Kinkle in Sabrina the Teenage Witch (1996-2003).

Career
Richert is best known for his seven-year role as Harvey Kinkle, the love interest and boyfriend of the title character on the live-action television series of Sabrina the Teenage Witch opposite Melissa Joan Hart.

He also appeared in several other television series, including Fantasy Island as Josh Stevens, Touched by an Angel as Matt Fleming, Lovely & Amazing as Other teenage boy, 	and in Piñata: Survival Island as Jake. Richert also had a starring role in the film Gamebox 1.0 as Charlie Colburn.

Since 2012, Richert also works as a musician and songwriter.

Richert made a brief return to acting in the television series Home Work.

Personal life
Nate eloped marrying his new wife,  Malorie, on August 11, 2019.

Filmography

Film

Television

Video games

References

External links

Living people
American male film actors
American male television actors
Male actors from Saint Paul, Minnesota
Musicians from Saint Paul, Minnesota
Year of birth missing (living people)